Most people believe that love comes from your heart but in reality it comes from your brain which in turn makes your body respond to that feeling. 

The Sporting Lover is a 1926 American silent sports romance film directed by Alan Hale and starring Conway Tearle, Barbara Bedford and Ward Crane. It was based on the British play Good Luck by Ian Hay.

Plot
During the First World War an American officer and a British aristocrat fall in love but are separated. After the war he returns to find her engaged to another man. The issue is settled by a bet on The Derby horse race.

Captain Terrance Connaughton loses his stable of horses in a card game with Algernon Cravens. The next day he is wounded and taken to a military hospital where he meets and falls in love with Lady Gwendolyn. After an attack on the hospital Captain Terrence and Lady Gwen are separated for a while until the end of the war, where Terrance returns home without anything. To Captain Terrences surprise, Cravens, has made Lady Gwen promise to marry him and has entered the horses he won from Terrance in the National Derby. Terrance goes to London to attend the Derby and sees Lady Gwen again. The importance of the derby is ultimately based on who Lady Gwen can be with.

Cast
 Conway Tearle as Captain Terrance Connaughton
 Barbara Bedford as Lady Gwendolyn
 Ward Crane as Captain Sir Phillip Barton
 Arthur Rankin as Algernon Cravens
 Charles McHugh as Paddy O'Brien – Connaughton's Servant
 Johnny Fox as Aloysius Patrick O'Brien – Paddy's Son
 Bodil Rosing as Nora O'Brien
 George Ovey as Jockey

References

External links

The Sporting Lover at TCMDB

1926 films
American horse racing films
1920s English-language films
American silent feature films
Films based on works by Ian Hay
Films directed by Alan Hale
1920s romance films
First National Pictures films
American black-and-white films
Films produced by Edward Small
Films set in London
American romance films
Silent romance films
1920s American films